Catherine M. Cassidy (b. 1959, Pennsylvania) is an American writer and editor. She is the author of Win the Fat War for Moms.  

Cassidy worked as Editor-in-Chief of Prevention from 2000 to 2003. She was responsible for creating and producing the largest health publication and 14th largest magazine in the United States.   

In 2004, Cassidy was named Senior Vice President and Editor-in-Chief of Reiman Publications, a unit of The Reader's Digest Association with publications in 19 languages and 48 editions sold in more than 60 countries. She oversaw Taste of Home,, the largest food magazine in North America, with a paid circulation of 3.5 million.

Cassidy has helped to develop more than 200 publications on topics pertaining to health, nutrition, and fitness. She is the former managing editor of FIT magazine, which was published by Bob Anderson and Runner's World. She has worked to develop numerous books, articles and magazines.

Cassidy has a B.A. in journalism from San Jose State University.

Bibliography 
 Cassidy, Catherine, Win the Fat War for Moms, 113 real-life secrets to losing postpregnancy pounds, (2001) Rodale Press, 
 Cassidy, Catherine and the editors of FIT,  Figure Maintenance (1983), Anderson World Books,

References

External links 
Reiman Publications
Talk with Audrey interview with Catherine Cassidy.  Cassidy talks about traditional favorites and new classic recipes in her book, "Taste of Home" cookbook.

American magazine editors
Women magazine editors
Living people
1959 births
American non-fiction writers
San Jose State University alumni
Writers from Pennsylvania